Catherine Nyambura Ndereba (born 21 July 1972) is a Kenyan marathon runner. She has twice won the marathon at the World Championships in Athletics and won silver medals at the Summer Olympic Games in 2004 and 2008. She is also a four-time winner of the Boston Marathon. Ndereba broke the women's marathon world record in 2001, running 2:18:47 at the Chicago Marathon.

In 2008, Ndereba was described by Chicago Tribune sportswriter Philip Hersh as the greatest women's marathoner of all time.

Career
Ndereba is from Gatunganga in Nyeri District, and went to Ngorano Secondary School where she pursued her running career. In 1994, she was recruited into its athletics program by the Kenya Prisons Service. Ndereba was awarded the 2004 and 2005 Kenyan Sportswoman of the Year awards. She was awarded the Order of the Golden Warrior by President Mwai Kibaki in 2005.

Ndereba finished seventh at the 2009 London Marathon, equalling Katrin Dorre's record of 21 sub-2:30 hours marathons. She placed third at the Yokohama Women's Marathon later that year, finishing the course in a time of 2:29:13 hours. She did not finish another marathon race until October 2011, when she crossed the line in 2:30:14 hours for third at the Beijing Marathon.

Ndereba, whose nickname is "Catherine the Great", lives in Nairobi with her husband Anthony Maina and daughter Jane. Her brother Samuel and sister Anastasia are also marathon runners.

Achievements

 1995
 Represented Kenya internationally for the first time at a women's relay race in Seoul, Korea
 1996
 Ranked No. 2 in USA Track and Field's World Road Running Rankings; named Road Runner of the Year by Runner's World magazine and Road Racer of the Year by Running Times
 1997
 Did not race
 Gave birth to daughter, Jane.
 1998
 Named Road Runner of the Year by Runner's World and Road Racer of the Year by Running Times
 Won individual bronze and team gold at the IAAF World Half Marathon Championships in Palermo, Italy
 Ran the world's fastest times for the year at 5 kilometres (15:09), 12 kilometres (38:37), 15 kilometres (48:52), and 10 miles (53:07).
 Made her marathon debut at the Boston Marathon, finishing sixth in 2:28:27 hours
 Finished second at the New York City Marathon
 2000
 Boston Marathon winner
 Chicago Marathon winner
 Named AIMS World Athlete of the Year by the Association of International Marathons and Distance Races
 2001
 City-Pier-City Loop (half marathon) winner.
 Boston Marathon winner
 Chicago Marathon winner in a world record time
 2002
 Finished second at the Boston Marathon. Also finished second at the Chicago Marathon
 2003
 World Championships gold medalist in the marathon
 Sapporo half-marathon winner
 Finished second at both the New York City Marathon and the London Marathon
 2004
 2004 Summer Olympics, Athens - silver medalist in the marathon
 Boston Marathon winner
 2005
 Boston Marathon winner (the first four-time woman's winner)
 World Championships silver medalist
 2006
 Osaka International Ladies Marathon winner
 Bogota Half Marathon winner
 Finished third at the New York City Marathon
 2007
 World Championships gold medalist
 Finished fifth at the New York City Marathon
 2008
 2008 Summer Olympics, Beijing - silver medalist in the marathon
 Finished fifth at the New York City Marathon
 2009
 Finished sixth at the London Marathon
 2011
 Finished third at the Beijing International Marathon

Bibliography
 Catherine Ndereba: The Marathon Queen, by Ng’ang’a Mbugua. Sasa Sema Publications, 2008

References

External links

 
 "Catherine Ndereba", n°38 on Time’s list of "100 Olympic Athletes To Watch"
 "Catherine Ndereba" documentary project
 Famous People from Kenya

1972 births
Living people
People from Nyeri County
Kenyan female long-distance runners
Kenyan female marathon runners
Athletes (track and field) at the 2004 Summer Olympics
Athletes (track and field) at the 2008 Summer Olympics
Olympic athletes of Kenya
Olympic silver medalists for Kenya
Boston Marathon female winners
Chicago Marathon female winners
World record setters in athletics (track and field)
Recipients of the Order of the Golden Heart of Kenya
World Athletics Championships medalists
Medalists at the 2008 Summer Olympics
Medalists at the 2004 Summer Olympics
Olympic silver medalists in athletics (track and field)
Recipients of the Association of International Marathons and Distance Races Best Marathon Runner Award
World Athletics Championships winners
20th-century Kenyan women
21st-century Kenyan women